Easter Friday, or Bright Friday, is the Friday after the Christian festival of Easter. At times, this name has been confused with Good Friday, which falls a week earlier.

Since the date of Easter is calculated differently by Eastern and Western Christians, the date of the Western Churches' Easter Friday is often different from the Eastern Bright Friday.

Western Christianity
In the Roman Catholic Church, Lutheran Churches and some Anglican Churches, Easter Friday falls within the Octave of Easter. The date of Easter Friday changes from year to year, following the changing date of Easter Week. Since Easter Sunday falls between March 22 and April 25, it follows that Easter Friday falls between March 27 and April 30. Occurrence in March is relatively uncommon, with the most recent occurrence having been March 28, 2008 and the next occurrence to be March 30, 2035.

The dates for the current decade are as follows:
 2020: April 17
 2021: April 9
 2022: April 22
 2023: April 14
 2024: April 5
 2025: April 25
 2026: April 10
 2027: April 2
 2028: April 21
 2029: April 6

Eastern Christianity
In the Eastern Orthodox Church and the Eastern Catholic Churches which follow the Byzantine Rite, this day is referred to as "Bright Friday". All of the services for Pascha (Easter) are repeated every day of Bright Week (Easter Week), except for the hymns from the Octoechos. On Bright Friday, the Resurrection hymns from the Octoechos are taken from Tone Six.

In addition to the Paschal hymns, propers in honour of the Theotokos (Virgin Mary) as the "Life-giving Spring" are chanted on Bright Friday, and there is customarily a Lesser Blessing of Waters.

Because the date of Pascha is movable, Bright Friday is a part of the Paschal cycle, and changes from year to year. Eastern Christianity calculates the date of Easter differently from the West (see Computus for details). In 2019 it fell on May 3 (April 20 Old Style), in 2020 it falls on April 24 (April 11) and in 2021 it falls on May 7 (April 24).

See also
Easter Week
Easter Monday
Easter Tuesday
Easter Saturday

References

External links
Bright Friday: The Life Giving Spring of the Mother of God Orthodox icon and synaxarion

Eastertide
Catholic liturgy
Byzantine Rite
Eastern Orthodox liturgical days
March observances
April observances
May observances
Friday